Tennis at the 2015 European Youth Summer Olympic Festival

Medal events

References

2015 European Youth Summer Olympic Festival
European Youth Summer Olympic Festival
2015
Tennis tournaments in Georgia (country)